René Schicker (born 28 September 1984) is an Austrian footballer who currently it the head coach and player of USV Hof bei Straden.

Later and coaching career
In June 2016, Schicker was appointed assistant coach of Admira Wacker's B-team. At the time, he was also playing for SV Stripfing in the 1. NÖN-Landesliga.

In the summer 2017, he moved to SC Wiener Viktoria. In January 2019, Schicker was appointed player-head coach of USV Hof bei Straden. During 2020, Schicker also helped coaching the U10 and U11s at DSV Leoben.

Club statistics

Updated to games played as of 6 July 2016.

References

1984 births
Living people
People from Leoben
Austrian footballers
Austria youth international footballers
Austria under-21 international footballers
Association football midfielders
DSV Leoben players
FC Red Bull Salzburg players
Kapfenberger SV players
FC St. Gallen players
FC Kärnten players
FC Admira Wacker Mödling players
TSV Hartberg players
Austrian Football Bundesliga players
2. Liga (Austria) players
Swiss Super League players
Austrian expatriate footballers
Expatriate footballers in Switzerland
Austrian expatriate sportspeople in Switzerland
Austrian football managers
Footballers from Styria